Oxyrhabdium modestum, commonly known as the Philippine shrub snake, is a species of snake in the family Cyclocoridae. It is found the Africa on the islands of Basilan, Bohol, Dinagat, Leyte, Mindanao, Negros and Samar.

References 

Cyclocoridae
Snakes of Asia
Reptiles of the Philippines
Reptiles of Indonesia
Reptiles described in 1853
Taxa named by André Marie Constant Duméril